UFC Fight Night: Joanna vs. Waterson (also known as UFC Fight Night 161 or  UFC on ESPN+ 19) was a mixed martial arts event produced by the Ultimate Fighting Championship that took place on October 12, 2019 at Amalie Arena in Tampa, Florida.

Background
While not officially announced by the organization, the event was initially linked to the newly constructed Chase Center in San Francisco, California, which would have marked the promotion's first visit to the city. It would have also been the first trip to the Bay Area since UFC 117 in 2010. However, the plans for a San Francisco debut fizzled and the promotion confirmed that the event would instead take place in Tampa, Florida. The event marked the promotion's third visit to Tampa and its second visit to Amalie Arena, following UFC on Fox: Teixeira vs. Evans in April of 2016.

A women's strawweight bout between former UFC Women's Strawweight Champion Joanna Jędrzejczyk and former Invicta FC Atomweight Champion Michelle Waterson served as the event headliner.

A middleweight bout between The Ultimate Fighter: Team Joanna vs. Team Cláudia light heavyweight winner Andrew Sanchez and Marvin Vettori was originally scheduled for September 14 at UFC Fight Night: Cowboy vs. Gaethje. However, the bout was canceled after Sanchez was pulled during the week leading up to the event due to an eye infection. In turn, the pairing was left intact and rescheduled for this event.

Promotional newcomer Brok Weaver was scheduled to face Thomas Gifford in a lightweight out at the event. However, Weaver pulled out of the bout on October 6 for undisclosed reasons. He was replaced by Mike Davis.

Results

Bonus awards
The following fighters received $50,000 bonuses.
Fight of the Night: Cub Swanson vs. Kron Gracie
Performance of the Night: Niko Price and Marlon Vera

See also 

 List of UFC events
 2019 in UFC
 List of current UFC fighters

References 

UFC Fight Night
2019 in mixed martial arts
Mixed martial arts in Florida
Sports competitions in Tampa, Florida
Events in Tampa, Florida